"Down in the Valley" is a 1962 R&B song written by Bert Berns and Solomon Burke and originally recorded by Solomon Burke. It was released on Atlantic as a B-side to "I'm Hanging Up My Heart For You". It was covered by Otis Redding on his album Otis Blue. Burke's original version is a classic example of early country soul with booming vocals.

Burke song
During a recording session at Atlantic Record on April 4, 1962, Burke recorded five songs, including "I'm Hanging Up My Heart For You" (#15 R&B; #85 Pop) b/w "Down In The Valley" (#20 R&B; #71 Pop) (Atlantic 2147). For "Down in the Valley", Burke borrowed from a traditional folk song "Down in the Valley", that was written as early as 1800, and sung by The Andrews Sisters in the 1944 film  Moonlight and Cactus, and by Patti Page in 1951. In August 2008 Burke told Mojo magazine: 
 Burke recalled: "I put my own feelings and words to it, and was lucky enough by the grace of God to capture the song, when it was in P.D., able to have a copyright on it." "Down in the Valley" debuted in the US charts on May 26, 1965, and peaked at #20 in the R&B charts, #71 in the Pop charts, and at #19 in the Adult Contemporary charts.

Redding rendition

The song was later covered by Otis Redding on his 1965 album Otis Blue, and was featured in the 1996 film 2 Days in the Valley, and generated income for Cassandra Berns, who inherited the publishing rights from her father, Bert Berns, who was credited as co-writer, along with "Babe" Chivian, and Joseph C. Martin.

Notes

External links
Solomon Burke's Down in the Valley lyrics

1964 singles
Otis Redding songs
Songs written by Bert Berns
Solomon Burke songs
Songs written by Solomon Burke
1962 songs
Atlantic Records singles